Rodney Graham is an American politician who has served in the Vermont House of Representatives since 2014.

He is a dairy farmer and producer of maple sugar. He is a member of the Vermont Farm Bureau, the Vermont Sugar Makers Association, Agri-Mark/Cabot Coop, and the Organic Valley Coop.

References

Living people
21st-century American politicians
Republican Party members of the Vermont House of Representatives
Year of birth missing (living people)